Tirur Taluk comes under Tirur revenue division in Malappuram district of Kerala, India. Its headquarters is the town of Tirur. Tirur Taluk contains four municipalities - Tanur, Tirur, Kottakkal, and Valanchery. Most of the administrative offices are located in the Mini-Civil Stations at Tirur, Kuttippuram, and Tanur. Most of the villages in present-day Tirur Taluk were parts of the medieval Kingdom of Tanur (Vettathunadu). The port of Tanur was an important port town in the southwestern coast of India during medieval period.

History
Tirur Taluk was formed on 1 November 1957 by carving 43 villages out of the Old Ponnani taluk and 30 villages out of the Old Eranad Taluk. Tirur, Tanur, and Kuttippuram Revenue blocks were taken from the Old Ponnani taluk while the Revenue blocks of Tirurangadi and Vengara  were taken out of the Old Eranad Taluk. At that time, Tirur Taluk was the largest coastal Taluk in Kerala which had contained the entire coastal belt wedged between Beypore port and Ponnani port (having nearly 65 km seacoast). Later on 16 June 1969, three villages, namely Feroke, Ramanattukara, and Kadalundi, were transferred from Tirur Taluk to Kozhikode Taluk, and Parudur village from Kuttippuram block was transferred to the Ottapalam Taluk. Later in 1990's, the Revenue blocks of Tirurangadi and Vengara were separated from Tirur Taluk to form Tirurangadi Taluk, and the revenue villages of Kottakkal and Ponmala were added newly to Tirur Taluk from Eranad Taluk.

Currently, Tirur Taluk, having 30 villages, is the most populous Taluk of Malappuram District.

Villages
Tirur taluk contains the following 30 villages.
 Ananthavoor
 Athavanad
 Cheriyamundam
 Edayur
 Irimbiliyam
 Kalpakanchery
 Kattiparuthy
 Kottakkal
 Kurumbathur
 Kuttippuram
 Mangalam
 Marakkara
 Melmuri
 Naduvattom
 Niramaruthur
 Ozhur 
 Pariyapuram
 Perumanna
 Ponmala
 Ponmundam
 Purathur
 Tanalur
 Tanur
 Thalakkad
 Tirunavaya
 Tirur
 Trikkandiyur
 Triprangode
 Valavannur
 Vettom

Notable people from Tirur Taluk

Tirur region
 Abdurahiman Randathani - politician and former MLA.
 Achyutha Pisharadi - a Sanskrit grammarian, astronomer and mathematician.
 vijayan (actor)    - actor
 Hemanth Menon - actor 
 Adil Ibrahim - actor.
 Azad Moopen - doctor.
 B. M. Kutty - journalist.
 C. Radhakrishnan - writer and film director.
 Damodara Nambudiri - mathematician.
 Dileep K. Nair - Educationist.
 Govinda Bhattathiri - mathematician.
 K. V. Ramakrishnan, poet.
 Kalamandalam Kalyanikutty Amma - Resurrector of Mohiniyattam.
 Kurukkoli Moideen, Politician and MLA.
 Kuttikrishna Marar - literary critic.
 Malayath Appunni - poet and children's writer.
 Melpathur Narayana Bhattathiri - mathematician and Sanskrit poet.
 Mohammed Irshad - Footballer.
 Mohamed Salah - footballer.
 N. Samsudheen - Politician and MLA.
 P. Nandakumar - Politician and MLA.
 Parameshvara Nambudiri - mathematician.
 Pulapre Balakrishnan - Economist and Educationalist.
 Ranjith Padinhateeri - biological physicist,
 Ravi Vallathol - actor.
 Salman Kalliyath - Footballer.
 T. M. Nair - Political activist.
 Thunchaththu Ezhuthachan - Father of Malayalam language.
 Tirur Nambissan - Kathakali singer.
 V. Abdurahiman - Minister of Kerala.
 Vaidyaratnam Triprangode Moossad - Ayurvedic physician.
 Vallathol Narayana Menon - One of the triumvirate poets of Malayalam and the founder of Kerala Kalamandalam.

Kottakkal region
 Vaidyaratnam P. S. Warrier (founder of Kottakkal Arya Vaidya Sala)
 K C Manorama Thampuratti (eminent Sanskrit poet)
 K. C. Manavedan Raja (founder of Raja's High School, Zamorin of Calicut during 1932-1937)
 M. K. Vellodi (Indian civil servant, diplomat, former Cabinet Secretary)
 Dr. K. C. K. E Raja, former Vice Chancellor  Kerala University and Director General of Health Services.
 Sangita Madhavan Nair, Actress
 U. A. Beeran
 Jayasree Kalathil, Researcher.
P. K. Warrier
 Kottakkal Sivaraman (eminent Kathakali artist)
 V. C. Balakrishna Panicker
 Kottakkal Madhu (Kathakali singer)
 M. P. Abdussamad Samadani (politician, MLA, former Member of Parliament)
 Sachin Warrier (playback singer and composer)

Valanchery region
 Azhvanchery Thamprakkal - Former chief of Nambudiris of Kerala.
 K T Jaleel, politician and former minister.
 Zakariya Mohammed, director, scriptwriter and actor.
 Unni Menon, playback singer.
 Shweta Menon, actress.
 Aneesh G. Menon, actor.
 Edasseri Govindan Nair, poet.
 K. V. Ramakrishnan, poet.
 Iqbal Kuttippuram, Screenwriter.
 Kuttippuram Kesavan Nair, poet.
 M. T. Vasudevan Nair , poet.
 V. P. Sanu, politician.
 Ahmad Kutty, North American Islamic scholar.
 Faisal Kutty, Lawyer, law professor, public speaker, orator.

Taluks of Malappuram

See also 
 List of villages in Malappuram district
 List of Gram Panchayats in Malappuram district
 List of desoms in Malappuram district (1981)
 Revenue Divisions of Kerala

References 

Taluks of Kerala